John Langford is an Australian rugby union player. He played as a Lock. He played for Sydney University, Gordon, Brumbies, Munster, and Australia.

References

External links
Munster profile
ESPNscrum profile

1968 births
Living people
Australia international rugby union players
Australian rugby union players
ACT Brumbies players
Munster Rugby players
Rugby union players from Wagga Wagga
Rugby union locks